Ringgold Wilmer Lardner Jr. (August 19, 1915 – October 31, 2000) was an American screenwriter. A member of the "Hollywood Ten", he was blacklisted by the Hollywood film studios during the late 1940s and 1950s after his appearance as an "unfriendly" witness before the House Un-American Activities Committee (HUAC) leading to Lardner's being found guilty of contempt of Congress.

Early life 
Born in Chicago, he was the son of Ellis (Abbott) and journalist and humorist Ring Lardner and the brother of James, John and David Lardner. He was educated at Phillips Academy in Andover, Massachusetts and Princeton University, where he joined the Socialist Club. In his sophomore year he enrolled at the Anglo-American Institute of the University of Moscow. Lardner returned to New York and, in 1935, briefly worked at the Daily Mirror before signing on as publicity director with David O. Selznick's new movie company. Lardner joined the US Communist Party in 1937.

Career 
Lardner moved to Hollywood where he worked as a publicist and script doctor before going on to write his own material. This included Woman of the Year (1942), a film that won him and Michael Kanin the Best Original Screenplay Academy Award. Lardner also worked on the scripts for the films Laura (1944), Brotherhood of Man (1946), Forever Amber (1947), and M*A*S*H (1970). The script of the latter earned him an Academy Award for Best Adapted Screenplay.

Lardner held strong left-wing views, and in the 1930s helped to raise funds for the Republican cause during the Spanish Civil War. He was also involved in organizing anti-fascist demonstrations. His brother, James Lardner, was a member of the Abraham Lincoln Brigade, and was killed in action in Spain in 1938.

Although his political involvement upset the owners of the film studios, he continued to be employed and in 1947 became one of the highest paid scriptwriters in Hollywood when he signed a contract with 20th Century Fox at $2,000 a week (equivalent to $ a week today).

Blacklisting 

After the Second World War the House Un-American Activities Committee (HUAC) began an investigation the Hollywood motion picture industry. In September 1947, the HUAC interviewed 41 people who were working in Hollywood. These individuals attended voluntarily and became known as "friendly witnesses". During their testimony, they named several people whom they accused of holding views sympathetic to communism.

Lardner appeared before the HUAC on October 30, 1947, but like Alvah Bessie, Herbert Biberman, Albert Maltz, Adrian Scott, Dalton Trumbo, Lester Cole, Edward Dmytryk, Samuel Ornitz and John Howard Lawson, he refused to answer any questions. Known as the "Hollywood Ten", they claimed that the First Amendment to the United States Constitution clearly gave them the right to do this. HUAC and the courts during appeals disagreed and all were found guilty of contempt of Congress. Lardner was sentenced to 12 months in the Federal Correctional Institution, Danbury and fined $1,000. He had been dismissed by Fox on October 28, 1947.

Blacklisted by the Hollywood studios, Lardner worked for the next couple of years on the novel The Ecstasy of Owen Muir (1954). Beginning in 1955, Lardner and fellow blacklistee Ian McLellan Hunter, working under pseudonyms, wrote episodes of television series, including The Adventures of Robin Hood, The Adventures of Sir Lancelot, and The Buccaneers, for producer Hannah Weinstein, an expatriate American living in England. For several years, meetings there with the producer were attended exclusively by Hunter, who had managed to gain a passport despite his political activities, whereas travel abroad for Lardner was deemed "not in the best interest of the United States" by the Passport Bureau, a restriction lasting from 1951 to 1958, when the Supreme Court ruled that passports could not be denied for political reasons.

The blacklist was lifted for Lardner when producer Martin Ransohoff and director Norman Jewison gave him  screen credit for writing The Cincinnati Kid (1965). His later work included M*A*S*H (1970), for which he won the Academy Award for Best Adapted Screenplay, and The Greatest (1977), for which he re-wrote the original script by Bill Gunn. His final film project was an adaptation of Roger Kahn's book The Boys of Summer.

According to Hungarian writer Miklós Vámos—who visited Lardner several times before his death—Lardner won an Academy Award for a movie he wrote under a pseudonym. Lardner refused to tell which movie it was, saying that it would be unfair to reveal it because the writer who allowed him to use his name as a front (as Lardner's pseudonym) was doing him a big favor at the time.

Personal life 
Lardner married Silvia Schulman, then David O. Selznick's secretary, in 1937. They had two children, a son and a daughter, and divorced in 1945. In 1946, in Las Vegas, Nevada, Lardner married Frances Chaney, an actress, and they remained wed until his death in 2000.  They had one son. Chaney had been married to Lardner's brother, David, until his death in 1944 and had two children, a daughter and a son, from that marriage.

Death 
On October 31, 2000, Lardner died in Manhattan, New York. He was the last surviving member of the Hollywood Ten.

Television tributes 

In the episode from the second season of The West Wing entitled "Somebody's Going to Emergency, Somebody's Going to Jail", Sam Seaborn, while attempting to gain a pardon for someone whom he believes had been falsely convicted of communist espionage in the 1950s, comments to an FBI agent "Ring Lardner's just died. How many years does he get back?"

In an episode of NBC's Studio 60 on the Sunset Strip, an elderly man is discovered in the studio. When asked his name, he replies first "Bessie Bibermann", then "Scott Trumbo", then "Cole Lardner". All six names are last names of members of the Hollywood Ten.

The episode of Robin Hood first broadcast by the BBC on December 1, 2007, was called "Lardner's Ring".

Works

See also 
 The Hollywood Ten documentary.

References

Further reading

External links 

Ring Lardner Jr. papers, Margaret Herrick Library, Academy of Motion Picture Arts and Sciences

1915 births
2000 deaths
American communists
American male journalists
20th-century American journalists
American male screenwriters
Best Adapted Screenplay Academy Award winners
Best Original Screenplay Academy Award winners
Hollywood blacklist
Phillips Academy alumni
Princeton University alumni
Writers from Chicago
20th-century American writers
Deaths from cancer in New York (state)
Screenwriters from Illinois
20th-century American male writers
20th-century American screenwriters